Jasur Alimjanovich Rizayev  (born 27 June 1974) is an Uzbek scientist, a doctor of medical sciences, professor. The rector of Samarkand State Medical Institute is one of the oldest institutions of higher education in Uzbekistan. He is the author of numerous textbooks and manuals for medical students.

Biography 
Alimjanovich was born on 27 June 1974, in Tashkent in a working-class family. In 1991, with a gold medal, he graduated from secondary school No.254 in the Shayhantahur district. After six years of undergraduate education in First Tashkent Medical Institute, in 1996 he started working as physician-intern at the chair of Orthopedic Dentistry and the institute's polyclinic. Between 1998 and 2000, he worked as a senior laboratory assistant at the Department of Therapeutic Dentistry of the institute. Over seven years (2000–2007) he worked as an assistant as well as a chairman of the student's union (2005–2007) of the Tashkent Medical Academy.

In 2007, thanks to his organizational and professional abilities, he was appointed as deputy chief physician of the 3rd clinic of the Tashkent Medical Academy, in 2009, the head of the Uchtepa medical association of the city of Tashkent, in 2011 he was appointed chief physician of the 3rd clinics of the Tashkent Medical Academy. In 2015, he successfully defended his doctoral dissertation on the topic " Development of concepts and programs for the prevention of periodontal disease in the population of Uzbekistan on the basis of complex social and hygienic research" From August 26, 2016, to 2020, he worked as a rector at Tashkent State Dental Institute.

In 2020 by the Decree of the Government of the Republic of Uzbekistan, he was appointed rector of the Samarkand State Medical Institute.

By the order of the Ministry of Health of the Republic of Uzbekistan No. 455 dated November 6, 2013, Jasur Rizaev was awarded the badge "Excellence in Healthcare". Moreover, he was also awarded badges of "20th Anniversary of Independence" and "25th Anniversary of Independence".

Rizaev Jasur Alimdzhanovich is a member of the American Association of Dentists, the European Association of Cariesology and the Dental Association of the CIS countries.

He is married and has two children.

Textbooks, study guides and monographs

Journals 
Journal of Biomedicine and Practices
Journal of Problems of Biology and Medicine
Physician bulletin journal

References

External links 
 tadqiqot.uz
 

1974 births
Living people
Academic staff of Samarkand State Medical Institute
Uzbekistani physicians